CCGS Cape Storm is a  of the Canadian Coast Guard.Normally assigned at terminus of the Welland Canal at Port Weller, Ontario, she is currently undergoing a Vessel Life Extension and has been temporarily replaced by the CCGS Cape Lambton.

On May 8, 2008 Cape Storm participated in a ceremony to honour American sailors of the US Navy who lost their lives when  and  sank in Canadian waters during the War of 1812.

Design
It contains two computer-operated Detroit DDEC-III 6V-92TA diesel engines providing a combined 870 shaft horsepower. It has two  four-blade propellers, and its complement is four crew members and five passengers.

Communication options include Raytheon 152 HF-SSB and Motorola Spectra 9000 VHF50W radios, and a Raytheon RAY 430 loudhailer system. The boat also supports the Simrad TD-L1550 VHF-FM radio direction finder. Raytheon provides a number of other electronic systems for the lifeboat, including the RAYCHART 620, the ST 30 heading indicator and ST 50 depth indicator, the NAV 398 global positioning system, a RAYPILOT 650 autopilot system, and either the R41X AN or SPS-69 radar systems.

References

Cape-class motor lifeboats
1999 ships
Ships built in Ontario
Ships of the Canadian Coast Guard